Waguespack is a surname. Notable people with the surname include:

Jacob Waguespack (born 1993), American baseball player
John Waguespack (born 1971), American artist and entrepreneur
Scott Waguespack (born 1970), American politician